Ville Laihiala (born 13 June 1973) is a Finnish musician. He was the vocalist and guitarist of the gothic metal band Poisonblack. He was also the frontman for Sentenced from 1996 (when he replaced their former bassist and vocalist Taneli Jarva) until the group ended their career in 2005. 
When joining Sentenced, he was soon accepted by fans. He wrote very few songs for Sentenced (whose main songwriters were Miika Tenkula and Sami Lopakka), for example the song "Aika Multaa Muistot" on the album The Cold White Light.

Discography

Albums 

With S-TOOL

Tolerance 0 (2017/Playground Music)
Exitus (2020/Playground Music)

With Poisonblack

Escapexstacy (2003/Century Media Records)
Lust Stained Despair (2006/Century Media Records)
A Dead Heavy Day (2008/Century Media Records)
 Of Rust and Bones (2010/Century Media Records)
 Drive (2011/Hype Records)
 Lyijy (2013/Warner Music Finland)
With Sentenced

Down (1996/Century Media Records)
Frozen (1998/Century Media Records)
Crimson (2000/Century Media Records)
The Cold White Light (2002/Century Media Records)
The Funeral Album (2005/Century Media Records)
Buried Alive (2006/Century Media Records)

DVDs 

With Sentenced

Buried Alive (2006/Century Media Records)

External links 
Official Sentenced website
Official S-TOOL Facebook page

Finnish heavy metal musicians
Finnish heavy metal singers
1973 births
Living people
People from Oulu
21st-century Finnish singers
21st-century guitarists